Trichostegia may refer to:
 Trichostegia (caddisfly), a caddisfly genus in the family Phryganeidae
 Trichostegia (plant), a plant genus in the family Asteraceae